Calbha Mòr is a tidal islet in Eddrachillis Bay, Sutherland, Scotland.

Geography
Calbha Mòr lies north of the Kylesku Bridge and west of the Duartmore forest in a location that is relatively inaccessible from the A894 road.

The sheltered Bàgh Chalbha lies to the east and a large escape of fish from a fish farm here took place in 2003.

Notes

References
 

Islands of Sutherland
Tidal islands of Scotland